Olive Young may refer to:

Olive Young (company), South Korean health and beauty store chain
Olive Young (actress) (1903–1940), Chinese-American actress, singer, and film director
Olive Young (1897–1922), only victim of the English murderer Ronald True

See also
Olive Yang (1927–2017), Burmese opium warlord
Oliver Young (1855–1908), Royal Navy officer and politician